Kraemer may refer to:

Kraemer (surname), includes a list of people with the name
 Kraemer, Louisiana, a U.S. census-designated place in Lafourche Parish
 Kraemer Textiles Inc., an American manufacturer that spins and sells yarns

See also 
 Kraemer House (disambiguation)
 Kramer (disambiguation)